Paltridge is a surname. Notable people with the surname include:

 Garth Paltridge (born 1940), Australian atmospheric physicist
 Henry Paltridge, Anglican bishop in Kenya
 Jim Paltridge (1891–1980), English footballer 
 Shane Paltridge KBE (1910–1966), Australian politician
 William Paltridge (1834–1890), Australian politician

See also
 
 Patridge